The Pro-Independence University Federation of Puerto Rico ( or FUPI) is a non-profit student organization that advocates for the independence of Puerto Rico. The Federation was founded in October 1956 by Hugo Margenat, a Puerto Rican poet and nationalist. In 1960, COINTELPRO operations began against the Movimiento Pro Independencia (MPI), the University Pro-Independence Federation (FUPI), and many other Puerto Rican independence organizations both on the island and in the communities of the Puerto Rican diaspora in the United States.

References

1956 establishments in Puerto Rico
Foro de São Paulo
Nationalist organizations
COINTELPRO targets
Political advocacy groups in Puerto Rico
Politics of Puerto Rico
Political organizations based in Puerto Rico
Separatism in the United States
University of Puerto Rico